A colambre is a wineskin whose origin comes from the 16th century. In Spanish it is known as "bota", a word used by Miguel de Cervantes in his early 17th century novel Don Quixote.

References 
Diccionario de la Real Academia Española de la Lengua. Voz: Colambre

Wine packaging and storage

ca:Bot (recipient)
de:Bota (Trinkbeutel)
es:Bota (recipiente)